VUF-5681 is a potent and selective histamine antagonist which binds selectively to the H3 subtype. However while VUF-5681 blocks the activity of more potent H3 agonists, recent studies suggest that it may have some weak partial agonist activity when administered by itself.

References 

H3 receptor antagonists
Imidazoles
4-Piperidinyl compounds